Octo was a French automobile manufactured at Courbevoie by Louis Vienne between 1921 and 1928.

The business
Louis Vienne founded the company in the Avenue Marceau at Courbevoie in order to produce Octo branded cars.   Production ended in 1928

(In the same year Vienne also established a second automobile brand at Courbevoie, but this car, the Carteret, did not last beyond 1922.)

The cars
At the 15th Paris Motor Show, in October 1919, Octo were already displaying their "Octo Type A" which competed in the 10HP taxation class and sat on a  wheelbase.    It was powered by a 4-cylinder engine of 1,590cc.   The engine for these first Octo cars came from Ballot.   At this time the manufacturer was quoting a price of 13,600 francs for a "Torpedo" bodied car.

This car was priced at 12,800 francs, which as before included a "Torpedo" body. Many Octos were delivered with 2-seater light bodies. Cars fitted with "Delivery vehicle" and "Roadster" bodies also appeared.

There was no Paris Motor Show in 1925, the venue being used instead for  an Exhibition of Decorative Arts. At the 20th Paris Motor Show, in October 1926 Octo exhibited two models. There was also a 9HP powered by a 1097cc Ruby engine and using a  wheelbase. Another development for 1926 was the addition of front-wheel brakes. The manufacturer's advertised prices, which as before included simple "Torpedo" bodies with 2 places in the shorter car and 4 places in the longer one, were respectively 18,800 francs and 30,000 francs.

Reading list 
Harald Linz, Halwart Schrader: Die Internationale Automobil-Enzyklopädie. United Soft Media Verlag, München 2008, . (German)
George Nick Georgano (Chefredakteur): The Beaulieu Encyclopedia of the Automobile. Volume 3: P–Z. Fitzroy Dearborn Publishers, Chicago 2001, . (English)
George Nick Georgano: Autos. Encyclopédie complète. 1885 à nos jours. Courtille, Paris 1975. (French)

Sources and notes 

Defunct motor vehicle manufacturers of France
Cars introduced in 1921
Vehicle manufacturing companies established in 1921
Vehicle manufacturing companies disestablished in 1928
French companies established in 1921
1928 disestablishments in France